Christine Cloarec (born 28 October 1964) is a French politician representing La République En Marche! (LREM) She was elected to the French National Assembly on 18 June 2017, representing the department of Ille-et-Vilaine.

Early life and education
A dance teacher in Vitré, Cloarec was born in Romainville, Seine-Saint-Denis and went to Brittany in 1978 to study physicality.

Political career
Cloarec was formerly a member of the UDI before joining La République En Marche! in early 2017.

In parliament, Cloarec serves as member of the Committee on Social Affairs. In addition to her committee assignments, she is part of the French-Italian Parliamentary Friendship Group.

Political positions
In September 2018, following the appointment of François de Rugy to the government, Cloarec supported the candidacy of Barbara Pompili as President of the National Assembly.

References

1964 births
Living people
Deputies of the 15th National Assembly of the French Fifth Republic
Deputies of the 16th National Assembly of the French Fifth Republic
Women members of the National Assembly (France)
La République En Marche! politicians
21st-century French women politicians
Union of Democrats and Independents politicians
People from Seine-Saint-Denis
Politicians from Brittany
Rennes 2 University alumni
French people of Breton descent
Members of Parliament for Ille-et-Vilaine